Hirasea acutissima is a species of small air-breathing land snail, a terrestrial pulmonate gastropod mollusk in the family Charopidae. The width of the shell is 2 mm.
The height of the shell is 4 mm. H. acutissima is endemic to Haha-jima in the Ogasawara Islands, Japan, and is listed as endangered in the IUCN Red List of Threatened Species. In 2007, the species was rediscovered after being considered to be extinct.

References

Endodontidae
Molluscs of Japan
Natural history of the Bonin Islands
Endemic fauna of Japan
Extinct animals of Japan
Taxonomy articles created by Polbot